Heerenveen IJsstadion (English: Heerenveen Ice Stadium) is a small railway station located in Heerenveen, Netherlands. The station, located about 3.5 kilometer from Heerenveen railway station, is operated by Nederlandse Spoorwegen but is currently only serviced in the event of sporting events at Thialf, the ice arena in Heerenveen.

The station, which has two platforms, was first opened on 1 June 1975 and provided regular service until 22 May 1977.

See also
 Thialf
 List of railway stations in Friesland

References

External links
NS website 
Dutch Public Transport journey planner 

Railway stations in Friesland
Railway stations opened in 1875
Railway stations on the Staatslijn A
1975 establishments in the Netherlands
Heerenveen
Railway stations in the Netherlands opened in the 20th century